Saleen is a small village and census town in County Cork, Ireland. It is located in the civil parish of Garranekinnefeake, in the Cork County Council municipal district of East Cork.  Saleen lies on the R630 regional road between Midleton and Whitegate.

Evidence of ancient settlement in the area includes a megalithic portal tomb in Saleen Creek near Rostellan, and ringfort sites in the neighbouring townlands of Scartlea Lower and Jamesbrook. It is listed on Cork County Council's Record of Protected Structures.

At the start of the 2020 school year, Saleen's national (primary) school had an enrollment  of over 450 pupils. The village had a population of 445 as of the 2016 census, up from 374 as of the 2011 census.

References

External links
 Saleen Historical Committee - Saleen and surrounds

Towns and villages in County Cork